Dragomir Bečanović (born 10 February 1965) is a Montenegrin retired judoka. He represented Yugoslavia at the 1988 Summer Olympics and 1989 World Judo Championships, where he earned a gold medal. He is the father of sprinter Stefan Bečanović.

Judo career
Bečanović first took up judo as a 10-year-old in the gym of elementary school "Olga Golović". He appeared at the 1988 Summer Olympics, competing in the lighter weight category. In 1989, Bečanović was the recipient of DSL Sport's Golden Badge and Sportske Novosti's Athlete of the Year award.

References

External links
 

Yugoslav male judoka
Montenegrin male judoka
Judoka at the 1988 Summer Olympics
Olympic judoka of Yugoslavia
1965 births
Living people
Sportspeople from Nikšić